Nicholas Scott Ure (born June 4, 1999), known professionally as Nicky Youre, is an American singer-songwriter. He is best known for his 2021 single "Sunroof".

Early life and education
Ure played water polo at Aliso Niguel High School, where he participated in the 2016 CIF Southern Section Division 3 Championship Game.  After graduating from high school, he continued his water polo career at Golden West College.  After earning his associate degree in business and public administration from Golden West, he went on to earn a Bachelor of Arts in international business from the University of California, San Diego.

Career
Ure started making music in 2017 and released his debut single "Sex and Lemonade" on June 4, 2020. "Sex and Lemonade" featured the producer Laiki, an artist who had previously issued the EP Together/Separate, featuring a number of collaborations with Ure.

His second single, "Sunroof", released in December 2021, was described by Sheesh Media as "an immediate ear-worm pop track". This track featured the Los Angeles-based musician and producer Dazy (an artist formerly known as Snocker) and reached the Top 30 in Australia and the top five of the Billboard Hot 100.

In March 2022, the 21-year-old singer released "Never Go Wrong", a single with fellow Californian David Hugo.

Later in November 2022, Ure released "Eyes on You".

In February 2023 he released a new song called “Shut Me Up”.

Discography

Singles

Awards and nominations

Notes

References

External links

 
 

Living people
1999 births
Aliso Niguel High School alumni
American male singer-songwriters
American pop singers
American TikTokers
Columbia Records artists
Golden West Rustlers athletes
Musicians from Anaheim, California
Singer-songwriters from California
University of California, San Diego alumni